Bhutni is an island in the Malda district of West Bengal, India. The island is part of the Manikchak community development block and is surrounded by the Ganga River and the Fulhar river.

Geography

Location
Bhutni is an island fully bounded by the river Ganges and the Fulahar river.

Area overview
The area shown in the adjoining map is the physiographic sub-region known as the diara. It “is a relatively well drained flat land formed by the fluvial deposition of newer alluvium.” The most note-worthy feature is the Farakka Barrage across the Ganges. The area is a part of the Malda Sadar subdivision, which is an overwhelmingly rural region, but the area shown in the map has pockets of urbanization with 17 census towns, concentrated mostly in the Kaliachak I CD block. The bank of the Ganges between Bhutni and Panchanandapur (both the places are marked on the map), is the area worst hit  by left bank erosion, a major problem in the Malda area. The ruins of Gauda, capital of several empires, is located in this area.

Note: The map alongside presents some of the notable locations in the area. All places marked in the map are linked in the larger full screen map.

Demographics
The island has 3 out of the 7 gram panchayats of the Manikchak Block. They are Dakshin Chandipur, Uttar Chandipur, and Hiranandapur. At the 2011 Census of India, Bhutni island had a total population of 89021, of which 46052 are male, while 42969 are females. Scheduled Castes numbered are 30149 and Scheduled Tribes numbered are 33063.

There are approximately 63 villages in Bhutni. It has three high schools, one senior madrasa, one government sponsored library, five post offices, four commercial banks, and one rural hospital. The only way to travel to Bhutni is by boat, but a  bridge is under construction. This will be opened to the public in 2019. The bridge is funded by the North Bengal Development Board, part of the government of West Bengal.

References

Villages in Malda district
Islands of West Bengal
Islands of India
Populated places in India